Trichur Subramaniam Rukmani, often known as T. S. Rukmani, is a Sanskritist who served many years on the faculty of Concordia University (1996-2012) and retired in 2012. She translated many Sanskrit texts into English.

Biography
Rukmani was born in Kerala State, India. She received a B.A. in Sanskrit, Mathematics, Economics and English (University of Delhi, 1952), and M.A. and Ph.D. degrees in Sanskrit (University of Delhi, 1954 and 1958).
She later received an honorary Doctor of Letters (D.Litt.) degree from University of Delhi (1991) in recognition of her four-volume translation of a Sanskrit text on Yoga philosophy by Vijnanabhiksu.

From 1964 to 1981 Rukmani served as Lecturer or Senior Lecturer at Indraprastha College, University of Delhi.
From 1982 to 1993 she served as the Principal of Miranda House, University of Delhi.
From 1993 to 1995, she served as Professor and Head of the Department of Hindu Studies and Indian Philosophy, University of Durban-Westville, in Durban, South Africa.
From 1996 to 2012 she served as Professor and Chair of the Department of Hindu Studies at Concordia University in Montreal, Canada.

In the mid-1990s, Rukmani served as chief editor of the Journal of the Indological Society of Southern Africa and of Nidān: International Journal for Indian Studies, and has served on the boards of several other journals, such as the Journal of Hinduism and the Journal of Hindu Studies (Oxford).

In 2013, Rukmani was the subject of a festschrift.

Selected works

 
 (freely downloadable)

References

External links
CV of T. S. Rukimani  (Concordia University)
T. S. Rukmani faculty page (Concordia University)
T. S. Rukmani faculty page (Oxford University)

Living people
Year of birth missing (living people)
Indian Sanskrit scholars
Indian Indologists
Yoga scholars
Academic staff of Delhi University
Academic staff of Concordia University
Delhi University alumni
People from Kerala